Elizabeth Bernholz (née Walling), b. 1981 in Canterbury, England, and better known by her stage name Gazelle Twin, is an electronic music composer, producer and musician who is currently based in Leicestershire, England. She is unsigned and releases music under her own label, Anti-Ghost Moon Ray, but has also released music on Lakeshore Records (US), Invada Records (UK), Last Gang Records (US/CAN), Moog Music Library (US), The Vinyl Factory (UK), NMC Recordings (UK), and Sugarcane Recordings (US).

Life and career
Elizabeth Bernholz studied music at the University of Sussex and graduated in 2006.

Walling conceived the Gazelle Twin project when she watched Fever Ray perform at the 2009 Loop Festival. She noted how "her show reminded me how powerful and liberating costume is, and I became interested in the power of disguise".

Her debut album, The Entire City, was released in July 2011 to critical acclaim. The album includes her three previously recorded singles, "Changelings" (2010), "I Am Shell I Am Bone" and "Men Like Gods" (2011). Bernholz named it as her "landscape album".

In 2014 Gazelle Twin released her second album, Unflesh, to further critical praise. In an interview with Guy Mankowski for PopMatters, Bernholz mentioned that in the live shows for Unflesh she would be performing in a version of her PE kit from school, saying she wanted to "go back to my teenage years to literally live out the idea of being a freak, like I thought I was (and was often made to feel) at the time."

On 21 September 2018, Bernholz released her third studio album, Pastoral, preceded by two singles: "Hobby Horse" and "Glory". The album's main inspirations were rural life and Brexit. It ranked at number one on The Quietus' "Top 100 Albums of 2018" list.

She has also remixed music by John Foxx.

Personal life
Elizabeth Bernholz lives in Leicestershire, England with her husband, Jez Bernholz, who also performs with her on stage, and her child whose name is Ezra. She previously lived in Brighton for 12 years.

Discography

Albums

EPs

Remix albums

Soundtrack albums

Singles

Remixes

Halsey - I am not a woman, I'm a god

References

External links
 

Year of birth missing (living people)
Living people
English women in electronic music
English electronic musicians
English women singers
Electronica musicians
Musicians from Brighton and Hove
Industrial musicians
People from Brighton